= Re:Coded =

Provider of coding bootcamps to refugees

Re:Coded is an international non-profit organization providing refugees in the Middle East with immersive coding/design bootcamps, in order to give them the ability to pursue careers in the digital industry. The organization was founded by Alexandra Clare and Marcello Bonatto in 2016.

Re:Coded launched its first coding bootcamp in 2017 Erbil for local youth and young people internally displaced by the ISIS insurgency in Iraq and has since expanded throughout the region. Their education-to-employment model has been recognized in international media.

The organization is registered in New York, but currently operates in Iraq, Turkey, Yemen and Lebanon. In 2019 it moved all programs online in the wake of COVID-19 and operates now as a remote-first workplace.
